Tota pulchra es is a Catholic prayer written in the fourth century. The title means "You are completely beautiful" (referring to the Virgin Mary). It speaks of her immaculate conception. Some of its verses are used as antiphons for the Feast of the Immaculate Conception. It takes some text from the book of Judith, and other text from Song of Songs, specifically 4:7.

Composers to set the prayer to music include Robert Schumann, Anton Bruckner, Pablo Casals, Maurice Duruflé, Guillaume du Fay, Grzegorz Gerwazy Gorczycki, Heinrich Isaac, James MacMillan. and Ola Gjeilo.

Text

Tota pulchra

Music 
Maurice Duruflé set the prayer in Latin as No. 2 of his Quatre Motets sur des thèmes grégoriens.

References

External links 
 

Roman Catholic prayers
Marian devotions